Gertrude Madeline "Trudy" Marshall (February 14, 1920 – May 23, 2004) was an American actress and model.

Early life 
Marshall was born in Brooklyn, New York, the daughter of Madeline (née Brennan) and Frederick Marshall. She studied drama at the Floral Park Memorial High School in New York.

Career 
A popular magazine cigarette girl during her modeling days for Harry Conover, Marshall was at different times "The Old Gold Girl", "The Chesterfield Girl", and "The Lucky Strike Girl".

Marshall was signed by 20th Century-Fox in 1942 and groomed in bit parts. In The Dancing Masters (1943) she was female lead to Laurel and Hardy. She next played a featured role in the World War II war drama The Fighting Sullivans (1944), the true story of a family that lost all five enlisted sons in the sinking of the USS Juneau off Guadalcanal in November 1942. Marshall played the surviving sister Genevieve.

Taking roles as a decorative ingenue for a time, Marshall later played the "other woman" in a few features. Semi-retired by the 1960s, she returned very infrequently to Hollywood. She appeared in the movie Once Is Not Enough (1975) with her daughter Deborah Raffin. Marshall was the hostess of her own radio and TV show in the 1980s in which she interviewed stars who attended special Hollywood events.

Personal life 
In 1944, Marshall married businessman Phillip Raffin, with whom she had three children, including model and actress Deborah Raffin. They remained together until his death in 1981.

Death 
On May 23, 2004, Marshall died at age 84 in her Century City, Los Angeles, home. She is interred in Hillside Memorial Park Cemetery.

Partial filmography 

 Secret Agent of Japan (1942) - Minor Role (uncredited)
 Footlight Serenade (1942) - Secretary (uncredited)
 Berlin Correspondent (1942) - Minor Role (uncredited)
 Orchestra Wives (1942) - Irene (uncredited)
 Girl Trouble (1942) - Miss Kennedy
 Thunder Birds (1942) - Red Cross Nurse Trainee (uncredited)
 Springtime in the Rockies (1942) - Marilyn Crothers (uncredited)
 Crash Dive (1943) - Telephone Operator (uncredited)
 Coney Island (1943) - Girl Friend (uncredited)
 Heaven Can Wait (1943) - Jane Van Cleve - Jack's Wife (uncredited)
 The Dancing Masters (1943) - Trudy Harlan
 The Fighting Sullivans (1944) - Genevieve 'Gen' Sullivan
 The Purple Heart (1944) - Mrs. Ross
 Ladies of Washington (1944) - Carol Northrup
 Roger Touhy, Gangster (1944) - Gloria
 Circumstantial Evidence (1945) - Agnes Hannon
 The Dolly Sisters (1945) - Lenora Baldwin
 Sentimental Journey (1946) - Ruth
 Talk About a Lady (1946) - Toni Marlowe
 Dragonwyck (1946) - Elizabeth Van Borden
 Boston Blackie and the Law (1946) - Irene
 Alias Mr. Twilight (1946) - Corky Corcoran
 Too Many Winners (1947) - Phyllis Hamilton
 Joe Palooka in the Knockout (1947) - Nina
 Key Witness (1947) - Marge Andrews
 Beyond Our Own (1947) - Ann Rogers
 The Fuller Brush Man (1948) - Sara Franzen
 Disaster (1948) - Jerry Hansford
 Shamrock Hill (1949)  - Carol Judson
 Barbary Pirate (1949) - Anne Ridgeway
 Mark of the Gorilla (1950) - Barbara Bentley
 I'll See You in My Dreams (1951) - Frankie Mason (uncredited)
 The President's Lady (1953) - Jane Donelson (uncredited)
 Full of Life (1956) - Nora Gregory
 Married Too Young (1962) - Susan Newton
 Jacqueline Susann's Once Is Not Enough (1975) - Myrna

References

External links 

 
 

1920 births
2004 deaths
20th-century American actresses
Actresses from New York (state)
American film actresses
American television actresses
Burials at Hillside Memorial Park Cemetery
Deaths from lung cancer in California
Female models from New York (state)
People from Brooklyn
21st-century American women